The Thermoanaerobacterales is a polyphyletic order of bacteria placed within the polyphyletic class Clostridia, and encompassing four families: the Thermoanaerobacteraceae, the Thermodesulfobiaceae, the Thermoanaerobacterales Family III. Incertae Sedis, and the Thermoanaerobacterales Family IV. Incertae Sedis, and various unplaced genera.

This order is noted for the species' abilities to survive in extreme environments without oxygen and of relatively elevated temperatures for a living being (up to 80-90 °C). An example organism in this order is Thermoanaerobacter ethanolicus.

Phylogeny
The Thermoanaerobacterales, as previously mentioned, is polyphyletic, and consists numerous morphologically similar clades:

Phylogeny

Note:
 polyphyletic Thermoanaerobacterales

References 

 
Bacteria orders
Clostridia
Thermophiles
Anaerobes
Polyphyletic groups